The Bloch MB.150 (later MB.151 to MB.157) was a French fighter aircraft developed and produced by Société des Avions Marcel Bloch. It featured an all-metal construction, complete with a retractable undercarriage, low cantilever wing and a fully enclosed cockpit.

The MB.150 was originally developed to conform with the requirements of the 1934 French Air Ministry competition seeking a new fighter design. Despite the competition being won by the competing Morane-Saulnier M.S.406, it was decided to proceed with development. Initially proving unable to attain flight, the modified prototype conducted its maiden flight in October 1937. Service trials of the MB.150 determined the aircraft to hold sufficient promise to warrant further work, leading to the adoption of an expanded and strengthened wing and a more refined Gnome-Rhone 14N-7 engine. During spring 1938, following the completion of further proving trials, an order for a pre-production batch of 25 aircraft was placed.

Redesigns of the MB.150 design led to the improved MB.151 and MB.152 which entered squadron service with the Armée de l'Air. By the outbreak of the Second World War, around 120 aircraft had been delivered to the Armée de l'Air but most were not sufficiently equipped to be considered operational. An improved MB.155 had greater range. Ordered into production in 1940, only ten aircraft had been completed by the Fall of France. The MB.157, a further improved model with a heavier and more powerful engine, was completed during the Vichy era. Though it demonstrated promising performance, it did not enter production.

Development

Origins
On 13 July 1934, the Service Technique Aéronautique (Aeronautical Technical Service) of the French Air Force issued the "C1 design" requirement for a new and completely modern single-seat interceptor fighter. Envisioned to make use of a monoplane layout and a retractable undercarriage, the prospective fighter aircraft was to serve as a replacement for the French Air Force's existing inventory of Dewoitine D.371, Dewoitine D.500, and Loire 46 aircraft. Amongst the various aviation companies who took interest in the specification, to which the potential for a large production order was attached, was French aircraft manufacturer Société des Avions Marcel Bloch.

The design team, headed by Maurice Roussel, was assembled at Bloch's Courbevoie facility in Paris. They designed an all-metal stressed skin monoplane, powered by a single 930 hp Gnome-Rhône 14Kfs radial engine and armed with a pair of wing-mounted Hispano-Suiza-built HS.404 cannon. During September 1935, construction of the type's first prototype, designated as the Bloch 150-01, commenced.

Although the C.1 competition was ultimately won by a rival design, the Morane-Saulnier M.S.406, it was decided to independently continue with the design's development. During 1936, these efforts culminated in the first attempted flight of the MB.150.01 prototype; unfortunately, the aircraft proved unable to leave the ground during the attempt. In the ensuing disappointment work on the design was temporarily halted, but development was resumed during early 1937. Following the implementation of various modifications, consisting of a strengthened wing of greater area, revised undercarriage arrangement and the installation of a  Gnome-Rhone 14N-0 radial engine with a three-blade constant speed propeller, on 29 September 1937, the MB.150 finally conducted its maiden flight.

Months later, the MB.150.01 was handed over to the Centre d'Essais du Materiel Aerien (CEMA) for service trials; during one such official test flight in December 1937, a maximum recorded speed of 434 km/h (269 mph) was attained. As a result of the CEMA flights, the prototype's performance proved to be sufficiently interesting as to warrant further development. This brought, at the beginning of 1938, a small increase in the aircraft's wing span, the replacement of the twin wing-mounted radiators by a single unit installed between the wheel wells, and the installation of an improved 14N-7 engine, which led to the prototype being re-designated as the MB.150.01M (M standing for modified). During spring 1938, further trials of the modified aircraft were performed by CEMA.

By this point, wider circumstances within France, such as the declining diplomatic situation between the European powers and the enactment of several urgent re-equipment programmes for the French Air Force, proved favourable for the MB.150. Specifically, on 15 March 1938, one such programme, referred to as Plan V, was adopted, calling for the near-unrealistic delivery of 940 modern fighter aircraft to the Air Force within the space of a year. Even the most optimistic projections saw 285 M.S.406 fighters delivered; while the MB.150 was deemed to have not yet completed development, it was decided to include the type within the production.

Accordingly, on 7 April 1938, upon the completion of trials in late spring 1938, the newly formed manufacturing consortium SNCASO received an initial order for a pre-production batch of 25 aircraft which, upon successful completion of the MB.150's development programme, was followed by the confirmation of a sizable order for 450 aircraft. Initially, 300 aircraft were to be delivered to the French Air Force by 1 April 1939; this was later cut down to 206 aircraft. In reality, only a single aircraft had been delivered by the prescribed deadline; other aircraft types also proved similarly unable to attain the tight delivery dates.

Further development
However, there was no direct production of the MB-150.01 as the aircraft having been deemed to be unsuitable for mass production. Amongst other changes needed, the structure of the airframe had to be redesigned in order to suit mass production. During early April 1938, an order was received for a three further prototypes; these were to explore the possibilities for installing more powerful engines of both French and American origins, such as the Hispano-Suiza 14AA, Pratt & Whitney R-1830 Twin Wasp, and further derivatives of the Gnome-Rhône 14N engine. Accordingly, this design effort led to the production of the MB.151.01 and MB.152.01 prototypes, which were developed and produced in parallel.

The first pre-production prototype, the MB.151.01, was quickly assembled at Courbevoie using the new simplified construction methods developed. This aircraft, which was fully armed, performed its first flight at Villacoublay Airfield, Île-de-France, on 18 August 1938. According to Christesco, the performance of the MB.151.01 was initially disappointing, leading to efforts to rectify performance issues. Development, and thus mass production, was delayed by the overheating of the engine (resulting in oil cooler types being tested and the most efficient of these adopted) and the aircraft being poorly balanced on its pitch axis at high speeds; neither the prototype nor the production MB.151 were able to attain 480 km/h, the design's estimated maximum speed.

According to Christesco, the MB.152.01 was "the first true aircraft" of the series. This model was equipped with a more powerful 1,030 hp Gnome-Rhône 14N-21 engine, capable of a speed of 520 km/h and equipped with a revised armament arrangement. On 15 December 1938, the MB.152.01 prototype performed its maiden flight. During January 1939, it was refitted with a more production-representative 1,000 hp Gnome-Rhône 14N-25 engine; various alternative engine cowlings and propellers were also tested to address engine overheating. To prevent further delays to the production aircraft, a large cowling was adopted, which increased drag and reduced the MB.152's flight performance.

The manufacturing of the fighter was divided amongst the various branches comprising SNCASO. Aside from a handful that were assembled at Courbevoie early on, roughly half of all aircraft produced were manufactured at Châteauroux, Berry while the other half were built at Bordeaux–Merignac, Nouvelle-Aquitaine. From January 1940 onwards, production was centered at Châteauroux alone. During December 1938, the first of the pre-production aircraft were completed; on 7 March 1939, the first production fighter was delivered to the French Air Force. By mid-May 1939, only 22 aircraft, a combination of MB.151s and MB.152s, had been dispatched; of these, only 10 had been accepted by the Air Force.

The MB.153 and MB.154 were intended as testbeds for American engines but only the MB.153 flew and when it crashed a few days later as damaged beyond repair, pursuit of these alternatives also ceased. Attention shifted to extending the range of the MB.152 by moving the cockpit aft to make room for a new fuel tank; other modifications included a slightly broader wing and revised aerodynamics around the cowling. The resulting MB.155, performed favourably in flight tests and was ordered into production in 1940 but only 10 aircraft had been completed by the Fall of France. Under the terms of the armistice, the remaining 25 on the production line were completed and delivered into Vichy service. From there, some eventually made their way into the Luftwaffe after 1942.

The final member of the family, the MB.157 had a far more powerful engine and eventually became a very different aircraft as the design evolved from the MB.152 to accommodate the larger and heavier 1,590 hp Gnome-Rhône 14R-4 motor. Unfinished at the time of the armistice, it was ordered to be completed and flown under German supervision. Demonstrating superb performance, it was taken to Orly where the power plant was removed for testing within a wind tunnel. The excellence in the design was confirmed by Germans when they completed and tested it in 1942, reaching up to  flat speed. It was later destroyed in an Allied air raid.

Operational history

Upon evaluation, early deliveries were deemed unsuitable for combat operations, principally due to issues with the tailplane; thus, plans were laid for the first 157 production fighters to be stored awaiting modification, while additional production examples were built with the correction made. Furthermore, the type was initially confined to performing training duties alone; prior to the outbreak of the Second World War, only a single squadron, allocated to the 1st Escadre de Chasse, received the type. Upon the eve of the conflict, around 249 aircraft had been manufactured; of these, roughly 123 aircraft had been accepted by the Armée de l'Air. However, few of these were considered to be flyable, the majority missing their gunsights and propellers.

On 26 September 1939, the first modified MB.152s were delivered to the French Air Force; the first of these fighters were allocated to active squadrons by early October and, by mid-November 1939, two separate Groupes de Chasse (fighter groups) had been equipped with 26 MB.152s each. At this point, the type still demonstrated some unfavourable flight characteristics, such as during steep dives. Meanwhile, increasing numbers of MB.151 aircraft were being delivered to be squadrons for training purposes in advance of their anticipated conversion to the MB.152. During the initial stage of the conflict, known as the Phoney War, very few engagements between the MB.152 and the aircraft of the Luftwaffe occurred; in this period, only a single kill of a Junkers Ju 88 was recorded.

During the Battle of France, a mixture of MB.151s and MB.152s equipped nine Groupes de Chasse; the MB.152 was the most numerous aircraft remaining in service during the final weeks prior to the signing of the Armistice of 22 June 1940. They proved to be tough aircraft, able to withstand considerable battle damage, rapidly reach high speeds during a dive, and functioned well as a gunnery platform. In air combat they were outmatched by the Messerschmitt Bf 109E on almost every count and proved slower than the twin-engined Bf 110. All Bloch units suffered heavy losses. In the week of heavy air fighting between 10 and 17 May, it was almost commonplace for a Bloch squadron to take off with eight or nine aircraft and come back with only two or three. On their side, the pilots of Bloch MB.152s claimed at least 188 enemy aircraft, for the loss of about 86 Blochs. In the third week in May the Bloch units had suffered severe losses and were pulled back to the Paris area to reform.

In comparison with its French contemporaries, according to aviation author Michel Cristesco: "the MB.152 was the least successful in combat and the one that suffered the heaviest losses". The type had numerous shortcomings; these problems included lack of manoeuvrability, unreliable guns, a relatively low range ( compared to 660 km for the Bf 109E) and being considerably underpowered. Writing of its faults, Cristesco attributed two major points for its performance shortcomings; its inadequate manoeuvrability and its range.

Following the Armistice, six groups continued to fly in the Vichy French Air Force until this was disbanded on 1 December 1942, the aircraft being passed over to the Royal Romanian Air Force by the Germans. By April 1941, the German Armistice Commission had agreed with a proposal to standardise the Vichy Air Force onto the Dewoitine D.520, resulting in all other single-engine fighters being phased out. The Germans seized around 173 fighters, 83 of which being reportedly serviceable, which were pressed into service with the Luftwaffe. Chrisesco alleged that around 95 MB.152s were secretly modified during late 1941 – early 1942 with a rear-fuselage fuel tank, giving them the range to cross the Mediterranean Sea to freedom.

Though the Greek government had ordered 25 MB.151s, actually only nine of these were actually exported to Greece by the time of the Armistice being signed. Those that were delivered were still in the process of working up when the Greco-Italian War broke out, leading to the wider Balkan Campaign between the major European fighters. The MB.151 fighters flew with the 24th Moira Dioxis (Fighter Squadron) of the Hellenic Royal Air Force, stationed at Elefsina against the Italians and Germans, scoring several air-to-air victories until 19 April 1941, when the last of Greece's MB.151s was shot down. At one stage, the Bulgarian government was in the process of negotiating the acquisition of MB.152 fighters with the Vichy government. During February 1943, a contract for delivery of 20 aircraft was signed, but this was vetoed by the German authorities, which by now had a controlling say within Vichy French politics. Instead, Bulgaria later received a series of Dewoitine D.520s to meet their needs.

Variants
MB.150
Single MB.150.01 prototype powered by a single Gnome-Rhône 14N-07
MB.151
MB.151.01 prototype and MB.151.C1 initial production versions powered by 920hp Gnome-Rhône 14N-35 engines (144 built)
MB.152
MB.152.01 prototype and MB.152.C1 up-rated production versions produced in parallel with 151.C1, powered by 1,050hp Gnome-Rhône 14N-25 engines. (482 built)
MB.153
Single MB.153.01 prototype with Pratt & Whitney R-1830 Twin Wasp engine
MB.154
Proposed version with Wright R-1820 Cyclone engine. Not built.
MB.155
MB.155.01 prototype converted from a MB.152 and MB.155.C1 production versions powered by Gnome-Rhône 14N-49 engines (35 built)
MB.156
Proposed version with Gnome-Rhône 14R engine. Not built.
MB.157
Single prototype of advanced version, converted from the MB.152 and equipped with a 1,590hp Gnome-Rhône 14R-4 engine.

Operators

Armée de l'Air
 Groupe de Chasse I/1
 Groupe de Chasse II/1
 Groupe de Chasse II/6
 Groupe de Chasse I/8
 Groupe de Chasse II/8
 Groupe de Chasse II/9
 Groupe de Chasse III/9
 Groupe de Chasse II/10
 Groupe de Chasse III/10
 Escadrille de Chasse I/55
Aéronavale
 Escadrille AC2
 Escadrille AC3

Luftwaffe
 EJG 26 (at Cognac)
 JG 103 (at Bad Aibling)
 Jagdlehrer Staffel (at Guyancourt-Orange)

Royal Hellenic Air Force
 24th Pursuit Squadron

Polish Air Forces in exile in France
 Groupe de Chasse 1/145 Varsovie

Royal Romanian Air Force
 Vichy France
Armée de l'Air de l'Armistice
 Groupe de Chasse I/1 (at Lyon-Bron, reserve unit)
 Groupe de Chasse II/1 (at Luc)
 Groupe de Chasse I/8 (at Montpellier-Fréjorgues)
 Groupe de Chasse II/8 (at Marignane)
 Groupe de Chasse II/9 (at Aulnat, reserve unit)
 Groupe de Chasse III/9 (at Salon-de-Provence)
 Groupe de Chasse I/13 (at Nîmes-Garons)
 Groupe de Chasse III/13 (at Nîmes-Garons)
 United Kingdom
Royal Air Force
 Following the Battle of France Polish ace pilot Zdzislaw Henneberg and his two wingmen flew their MB.152C.1s to England, the aircraft were repainted in RAF roundels and used briefly for local air defence and technical evaluation before being grounded due to a lack of spares.

Specifications (MB.152C.1)

See also

References

Citations

Bibliography
 Belcarz, Bartłomiej. Morane MS 406C1, Caudron Cyclone CR 714C1, Bloch MB 151/152 (Polskie Skrzydła 2) (in Polish), Sandomierz, Poland: Stratus, 2004. . About the use of the MB.151/152 by Polish Pilots of the Armée de l'Air.
 Botquin, Gaston. The Morane Saulnier 406. Leatherhead, Surrey, UK: Profile Publications, 1967. No ISBN.
 Breffort, Dominique and André Jouineau. French Aircraft from 1939 to 1942, Volume 1: from Amiot to Curtiss. Paris, France: Histoire & Collections, 2004. .
 Brindley, John F. French Fighters of World War Two, Volume One. Windsor, UK; Hylton Lacy Publishers Ltd., 1971. .
 
 
 
 
 Cristesco, Michel. The M.Bloch 151 & 152 (Aircraft in Profile number 201). Leatherhead, Surrey, UK: Profile Publications Ltd., 1967. No ISBN.
 Ehrengardt, Christian-Jacques with Michel Cristesco and Raymond Danel. Bloch 152 Spécial. Paris, France: IPMS France, 1968.
 Green, William. War Planes of the Second World War, Volume One: Fighters. London: Macdonald & Co.(Publishers) Ltd., 1960 (10th impression 1972). .
 Jackson, Robert. Fighter! The Story of Air Combat 1936-1945. London, Artur Barker Limited. 1979. .
 Joanne, Serge. Le Bloch MB-152 (Histoire de l'aviation 13) (in French). Outreau, France: LELA Presse, 2003. . (In French)
 Joanne, Serge. Marcel Bloch 151/152. Sandomierz, Poland/Redbourn, UK: Mushroom Model Publications, 2007. .
 Leyvastre, Pierre and Pierre Courteville. "Bloch's Fighters: the Contentious Combatants". Air International, April 1978, pp. 179–189, 204–205.
 Marchand, Patrick. Bloch 150, 151, 152, 155, 157, 700 C1. Le Muy, France: Les éditions d'Along, 2000. . (In French)
 
 
 Pelletier, Alain. French Fighters of World War II in Action (Aircraft Number 180). Carrollton, TX: Squadron/Signal Publications, Inc., 2002. .

Further reading
 Demonge, Lucien. "Le Bloch 151/152", Aviation Française Magazine. (AFM) 2005, No. 5. (Aug–Sep), pp. 38–55.

External links

 

Single-engined tractor aircraft
World War II French fighter aircraft
Low-wing aircraft
1930s French fighter aircraft
MB.150
Aircraft first flown in 1937